Miss Portugal is the oldest national pageant in Portugal since 1926. The main winner will represent the country at Miss Universe pageant.

History
Miss Portugal started in 1926 with Margarida Bastos Ferreira. Began 1960 the organization took a part at Miss Universe, the runners-up went to Miss World and Miss International and occasionally a candidate sent to Miss Europe beauty pageant. RTP - Rádio e Televisão de Portugal made the organization run for Portuguese Beauty pageant in Portugal for long time and from RTP, a second runner-up of Miss Portugal 1996 Fernanda Alves earned Portugal's first Miss International crown. In 2002, the pageant ended the production and no more Portuguese at Miss Universe pageant. 

In 2011 the new pageant held as Miss Universo Portugal contest and it continued in 2014 as a beginning from Miss República Portuguesa by Isidiro de Brito Directorship. In 2014 the Portuguese representative at Miss Universe will be crowned at Miss Universo Portugal competition (separate contest but still in under Isidiro de Brito directorship). Between 2018 and 2021 the Miss Universo Portugal title crowned in Miss República Portuguesa pageant.

Began 2022 CNB Portugal took over the brand of Miss Portugal and remarked the Miss Portugal back in Portugal. The main winner will have opportunity to represent Portugal at Miss Universe.

CNB Portugal
Meanwhile CNB Portugal is the main organization of Miss Portugal since 2022 and in that organization there are some local pageants under that organization such as Miss Queen Portugal, Miss Teen Portugal, Mrs Portugal and Top Model Portugal. 
Miss Queen Portugal' whose main legacy are environmental causes, follows the platform of the Miss Earth Foundation. The winner of Miss Queen Portugal is the Portuguese representative in the Miss Earth pageant, which is one of the Big Four international beauty pageants in the world.
Miss Teen Portugal is a local pageant for teenagers in Portugal. There some licenses here for the titleholders such as Miss Teen International. Miss Teen Globe, Miss Teen Petite etc.
Mrs Portugal is a local pageant for mothers in Portugal. The main winner represents Portugal at Mrs Universe pageant.
Top Model Portugal' is a local pageant for Modeling career in Portugal.

Miss Universe license holder in Portugal
RTP - Rádio e Televisão de Portugal (Miss Portugal) (1960—2002)
GAETA, Promoções e Eventos, Lda. and NIU (2011)
Edward Walson (Miss Universo Portugal) (2015—2017)
Isidro de Brito (Miss República Portuguesa) (2014, 2018—2021)
Ricardo Montevero (CNB Portugal) (2022—present)

Titleholders

A Organização Miss Portugal

Miss Queen Portugal
The Miss Queen Portugal winners expected to be at Miss Earth pageant.

Titleholders under Miss Portugal org.

Miss Universo Portugal 

Before 2011 Miss Portugal 1959 to Miss Portugal 2001 winner participated at Miss Universe competition. Between 2002 and 2010 there was no franchise holder to sign up the Miss Universe organization. began 2011 the new pageant held as 'Miss Universo Portugal" contest and it continued in 2014 as a beginning from Miss República Portuguesa by Isidiro de Brito Directorship. Since 2014 the Portuguese representative at Miss Universe will be crowned at Miss Universo Portugal competition (separate contest but still in under Isidiro de Brito directorship). On occasion, when the winner does not qualify (due to age) for either contest, a runner-up is sent. Beginning in 2022, a separate Miss Universo Portugal has been created.

Miss Earth Portugal

See also
Miss República Portuguesa

References

External links
Official website

Miss Earth by country
Portuguese awards
Beauty pageants in Portugal